Gaby (Issime ;) is a town and comune in the Aosta Valley region of northwestern Italy.

Gaby is home to the 19th century Sanctuary of Vourry.

See also

Cities and towns in Aosta Valley